Chad Thomas Vaughn (born May 11, 1980 in Konawa, Oklahoma) is an American Olympic weightlifter.

He was a member of the 2004 Olympic team in Athens, Greece, and ranked 18th in the 77 kg category, lifting a total of 320 kg.

He competed in the 85 kg category at the 2005 World Weightlifting Championships, and ranked 14th lifting a total of 335 kg.

At the 2007 World Weightlifting Championships he ranked 24th in the 77 kg category, lifting a total of 326 kg.

He qualified for the 2008 Summer Olympics.

Vaughn currently resides in San Antonio, Texas, and is coached by Richard Flemming.

References

External links
 
 
 
 
 
 

1980 births
Living people
American male weightlifters
Olympic weightlifters of the United States
Weightlifters at the 2003 Pan American Games
Weightlifters at the 2007 Pan American Games
Weightlifters at the 2011 Pan American Games
Weightlifters at the 2004 Summer Olympics
Weightlifters at the 2008 Summer Olympics
Pan American Games gold medalists for the United States
Pan American Games medalists in weightlifting
Medalists at the 2011 Pan American Games
People from Konawa, Oklahoma
Sportspeople from San Antonio
21st-century American people